George Crampton (30 March 1875 – 27 December 1946) was a South African international rugby union player who played as a forward.

He made 1 appearance for South Africa in 1903.

References

South African rugby union players
South Africa international rugby union players
1875 births
1946 deaths
Rugby union forwards
Griquas (rugby union) players

People educated at Bedford School
Irish emigrants to South Africa (before 1923)